Óscar Adrián Lucero (born 16 August 1984) is an Argentine professional footballer who plays as a central midfielder for Enosis Neon Paralimni.

Career

Lucero made his professional debut in March 2004 for Newell's, later that year the club won the Apertura 2004 championship, but Lucero watched from the sidelines without making a single first team appearance.

From 2005 onwards Lucero has established himself as a regular member of the Newell's Old Boys first team. From 2012 onwards he plays in Greece.

External links
  Argentine Primera statistics
 Football-Lineups player profile

1984 births
Living people
Sportspeople from Mendoza Province
Argentine footballers
Association football midfielders
Argentine Primera División players
Newell's Old Boys footballers
Racing Club de Avellaneda footballers
Olimpo footballers
Panthrakikos F.C. players
AEK Larnaca FC players
Apollon Smyrnis F.C. players
Xanthi F.C. players
Panetolikos F.C. players
Super League Greece players
Cypriot First Division players
Argentine expatriate footballers
Expatriate footballers in Greece
Expatriate footballers in Cyprus